Gregory Joel Abbott (born April 2, 1954) is an American singer, musician, composer and producer. Although he continues to record to date, he is best known for his singles in the mid-1980s including his platinum single, "Shake You Down", from his 1986 debut album.

Biography

Early life
Abbott was born in Harlem, New York.  Abbott's parents were from Venezuela and Antigua. During his early years, Abbott's mother taught him how to play piano and encouraged him to develop vocally. Before his career as a musician, Abbott studied psychology at University of California, Berkeley, and creative writing at Stanford; where he won a Wallace Stegner fellowship. Before becoming a musician, Abbott taught as a professor of English at the University of California, Berkeley.

Music career
One of Abbott's first opportunities in his studio was an album for an independent record label, which gave him the opportunity to do a duet with Whitney Houston. Continuing on, Abbott produced for the group EQ on Atlantic Records. In 1986, Abbott released his first solo album, Shake You Down. The title track for the album was a success, going platinum and topping the Billboard Hot 100. The album's second single, "I Got the Feelin' (It's Over)", reached Number 5 on the R&B chart. On the strength of its singles, the album reached platinum status and earned Abbott several awards.

Internationally, Abbott has also had success, winning first prize at the Tokyo Music Festival. The title track of his second album, "I'll Prove It to You", which was released in 1988, was featured on a Japanese movie soundtrack. In Belgium, he performed with Princess Stephanie of Monaco. Over the years much of his new music has been released via his own Mojo Man Entertainment label. Abbott has continued with his R&B sound, but he added a Caribbean influence to his 1996 album One World! In 2011, an album entitled Drop Your Mask was released. Abbott continues to release singles including a smooth jazz song "Chill" featuring saxophonist Gerald Albright.

Personal life
Abbott was married to American singer Freda Payne from 1976 until 1979. Their son, Gregory Joel Abbott, Jr., was born in 1977.

Discography

Studio albums

Singles

Compilation albums
 Super Hits (Legacy Recordings, 1998)
 Rhyme and Reason (Sony Music, 2006)

References

External links
 
 
 Mojo Man Entertainment
 Smooth Jazz Artist Guide

1954 births
Living people
20th-century African-American male singers
People from Harlem
American soul singers
Columbia Records artists
Singers from New York City
UC Berkeley College of Letters and Science alumni
Musicians from Berkeley, California
Singer-songwriters from California
Stanford University School of Humanities and Sciences alumni
University of California, Berkeley College of Letters and Science faculty
20th-century African-American academics
20th-century American academics
African-American male songwriters
21st-century African-American male singers
Singer-songwriters from New York (state)
21st-century African-American academics
21st-century American academics